The AWA World Heavyweight Championship was a professional wrestling world heavyweight championship and the highest ranked championship in the defunct American Wrestling Association (AWA). All AWA trademarks, including the AWA World Heavyweight Championship, are now owned by WWE. The championship was generally contested in professional wrestling matches, in which participants execute worked finishes rather than contend in direct competition.

History 

The AWA World Heavyweight Championship was established in May 1960, after the AWA became a separate promotion from the National Wrestling Alliance (NWA); the AWA had previously been a part of the NWA as its Minneapolis, Minnesota-area territory. The first champion was Pat O'Connor, who was recognized as the first champion upon the AWA's secession from the NWA as O'Connor held the NWA World Heavyweight Championship as well, which he won on January 9, 1959. The creation of the AWA World Heavyweight Championship along with the NWA World Heavyweight Championship would pave the way for the creation of many other world championships in other wrestling promotions. The AWA and the title became inactive in late 1990 and the organization officially closed down in August 1991 with the title also being decommissioned. The championship is featured in the video games WWE '13 as a downloadable title and as an unlockable title in WWE 2K14 and the seventh generation versions of WWE 2K15, WWE 2K16, and WWE 2K17.

Trademark infringement 
In 1996, Dale Gagner and his associate Jonnie Stewart, former AWA employees, began using the AWA name in the state of Minnesota and formed a promotion known as AWA Superstars of Wrestling, infringing on the AWA name. The promotion also created their own version of the AWA World Heavyweight Championship. In April 2007, World Wrestling Entertainment (WWE) filed a lawsuit against Dale Gagner citing trademark infringement, as WWE owned all American Wrestling Association properties due to their purchase after the AWA's closure, including the AWA World Heavyweight Championship. In October 2008, the court ruled in favor of WWE. The court ruling prohibits Gagner from exploiting or trading on the AWA name or any other derivatives.

Title history

Combined reigns

See also 
 List of early world heavyweight champions in professional wrestling
 World Heavyweight Championship (Omaha)
 USWA Unified World Heavyweight Championship
 WCWA World Heavyweight Championship
 WSL World Heavyweight Championship
 Zero1 World Heavyweight Championship

References

External links 
 AWA World Heavyweight Title History

American Wrestling Association championships
World heavyweight wrestling championships